Kavirat may refer to:
Kavirat District
Kavirat Rural District (disambiguation)